Damyan Yovanov Gruev (January 19, 1871 – December 23, 1906) was а Bulgarian teacher, revolutionary and insurgent leader in the Ottoman regions of Macedonia and Thrace.  He was one of the six founders of the Internal Macedonian Revolutionary Organization. Per the Macedonian historiography, he was an ethnic Macedonian. He's considered a national hero in Bulgaria and North Macedonia.

Biography

Early years

Dame Gruev was born in 1871 in the village of Smilevo, Monastir Vilayet, Ottoman Empire (present-day North Macedonia). He received his elementary education in Smilevo and continued his education in the Bulgarian Men's High School of Thessaloniki. He was part of a group excluded from the school following a student revolt. In early 1888, the group, consisting of 19 people, including other future IMRO-revolutionaries was attracted by Serbian propaganda. As a result, they went to study in a Serbian Gymnasium in Belgrade at the expense of the Saint Sava society. Gruev later continued his education in the Grandes écoles  in Belgrade. Following yet another revolt, Gruev and his associates were excluded from the Great School and emigrated en bloc to Bulgaria. Gruev was enrolled in Sofia University and, later, in the Young Macedonian Literary Society. He found also the circle "Druzhba", whose aim was to implement "Article 23" of the Treaty of Berlin (1878) on the autonomy of Macedonia. In 1891 Gruev was expelled from the university as he was suspected in the assassination of the Minister Hristo Belchev, but subsequently, this allegation turned out to be groundless.

Next, Gruev left the university and returned to Ottoman Macedonia region to apply himself to a new revolutionary organization. In order to carry out his plans more successfully, and possibly to avert the suspicion of the Turkish authorities, he decided to become a Bulgarian school teacher. The first two years after his return to Macedonia region he spent teaching, first in his native village of Smilevo, and later in the town of Prilep. Later, Gruev established himself in Thessaloniki and here laid the foundation of BMARC (the Bulgarian Macedonian-Adrianople Revolutionary Committees). With the cooperation of Hristo Tatarchev and Petar Pop Arsov among others, he came up with the Constitution and By-laws of IMARC. It was to be a secret organization under the guidance of a Central Committee, with local revolutionary committees throughout Macedonia and the region of Adrianople (Edirne). These regions were to be divided into revolutionary districts or rayons like in the April Uprising. In accordance with the Constitution, the first Central Revolutionary Committee was formed in the summer of 1894, under the chairmanship of Hristo Tatarchev.

1894 to 1900

In the summer of 1894 in Negotino, he organized the first local revolutionary committee, and soon after with the cooperation of Pere Toshev, the first district committee in the city of Štip. Gruev visited the cities of Resen, Ohrid, and Struga as well, and found the local population to be accepting his organization's revolutionary ideas very well. He remained a teacher in Štip during the academic year 1894–1895. In the fall of 1895 Gotse Delchev arrived in Štip with the idea of laying the foundations of a revolutionary movement seeking autonomy for Macedonia and Adrianople Thrace. Gruev and Delchev met for the first time and shared their ideas there. Gruev introduced Delchev to the plan already outlined by the Central Committee of Thessaloniki. After this, both Gruev and Gotse Delchev worked together in Štip and its environs.

The expansion of the IMRO at the time was phenomenal, particularly after Gruev settled in Thessaloniki during the years 1895–1897, in the quality of a Bulgarian school inspector. Gruev had become the soul and body of the Central revolutionary committee. Under his direction, secret revolutionary papers were issued, ciphers were introduced, pseudonyms or a nom de plume were used, and channels for secret communication between various other local and Macedonian committees were maintained. A representative of the Central Revolutionary Committee was sent to Sofia to take charge of purchasing and dispatching of the necessary war provisions for IMARC. Gruev's tirelessly travelled throughout Macedonia and the Vilayet of Adrianople and systematically established and organized committees in villages and cities. In 1897, Gruev was also one of the founders of the Society against Serbs. Unfortunately, for purely political reasons, and in order to avoid suspicion from the Ottoman authorities, IMARC decided to dismiss Gruev in 1898. Soon after his dismissal Gruev moved to Bitola and there with the cooperation of Petar Poparsov, Vasil Paskov and others, he began to issue a revolutionary paper.

He organized a system in which money was collected from Sunday schools through a special "revolutionary tax", and a quantity of war materials was purchased. Gruev was again appointed to the teaching staff now in the city of Bitola, and as such, he also assumed the management of the revolutionary movement in the Vilayet of Monastir (Bitola), while the active persons at the Committee in Thessaloniki were Hristo Tatarchev, Pere Toshev, and Hristo Matov. Gruev's activities in the Bitola district were not left unnoticed by the Ottoman authorities. Numerous chetas (bands) throughout the surrounding mountains began to terrorize the local authorities. Gruev, being suspected as a major factor in fostering this movement, was arrested on 6 August 1900. He was held in Bitola jail until May 1902. However, by using secret writings and ciphers, he was able to remain in contact with the local revolutionary committees, and direct the affairs of the revolutionary district of Bitola.

Uprising

In the latter part of May, 1902, Gruev was condemned to banishment in the prison of Podrum Kale in Anatolia. There he found Hristo Matov and Hristo Tatarchev, both sentenced to exile in January 1901. Gruev and his comrades were kept in Podroum Kale for ten months. Although he was away from Macedonia and Thrace itself, Gruev managed to keep himself informed as to the development and affairs of the IMARO. He kept up a steady stream of encrypted correspondence with Thessaloniki, Bitola, and Sofia. On Easter of 1903, at the instance of a general amnesty, he was released. Gruev hastened to Thessaloniki and there he found that the Central Committee, which was in charge of the IMARO, had already resolved to declare a general insurrection which was to take place during 1903. Although Gruev was not in accord with the Central Committee's decision, primarily because of the SMARO's lack of preparedness, he gave in to the decision of the Central Committee.

He left Thessaloniki and went to Smilevo where the insurrectionary Congress was to be held. The purpose of this Congress was to set the date for the declaration of the general insurrection and to outline the methods and tactics in its prosecution. Here Gruev met Boris Sarafov, who had just arrived from Bulgaria. Gruev was elected as chairman of this Congress, and the latter decided that the day of the declaration of the insurrection was to be 2 August 1903. Gruev, Boris Sarafov, and Anastas Lozanchev were elected by the Congress as the three members of the General Staff and empowered to direct the insurrectionary forces in the Bitola region. Gruev lived to see the retreat of the Turkish troops from his native village of Smilevo. He was engaged, during the course of the insurrection, in numerous skirmishes with the Ottoman Army. But with the arrival of Ottoman troops, any progress of the insurrection was made impossible and in a period of six weeks, it was completely crushed. Gruev put himself on the task of touring various revolutionary districts, disarming the insurgents, and storing up the war materials for future use. Gruev and his followers continued the work of organization and preparation for another uprising.

After the Uprising

In 1904 Dame Gruev chaired the Prilep Congress of the Bitola Revolutionary District of IMRO. In the autumn of that year, Dame was captured by the Serb's leader Micko Krstić, but was set free, with the assistance of Gligor Sokolović, after his negotiations with Pere Toshev. In 1905 Gruev headed the first General Congress of the organization after the uprising, the so-called Rila Congress. Here Dame Gruev was elected as a member of the Central Committee and became in fact its leader, until his death. Indeed, Dame was the only one who appeared to be capable of mastering Yane Sandanski's ambition for leadership. However, the Rila Congress failed to erase the political differences in the organization. There arose a need to conduct a new special congress in Sofia in December 1906, which never took place. At the end of 1906, Gruev moved with his detachment from Ottoman Macedonia to Sofia to attend the special Congress. On 23 December 1906, Dame Gruev and his detachment were discovered by the Turkish authorities near the village of Rusinovo (Maleševo district). Gruev and his band were confronted by Ottoman forces and in the following battle he was killed.

Legacy 

A high school in Sofia as well as Gruev Cove in Greenwich Island, South Shetland Islands, Antarctica are named after Dame Gruev.

In North Macedonia, he is regarded as an ethnic Macedonian who paved the way for the emancipation of a Macedonian nation and statehood. His name is part of the Macedonian national anthem "Today over Macedonia". A monument was erected in his honor in the Macedonia Square in Skopje in 2011, as part of the "Skopje 2014" project.

See also
 IMRO
 History of North Macedonia
 History of Bulgaria (1878–1946)
 Gotse Delchev
 Battle of Smilevo

References

Notes

1871 births
1906 deaths
Members of the Internal Macedonian Revolutionary Organization
Bulgarian revolutionaries
Prisoners and detainees of the Ottoman Empire
Bulgarian people imprisoned abroad
Bulgarian educators
Macedonian Bulgarians
Bulgarian Men's High School of Thessaloniki alumni